Miloslav Šimek (7 March 1940 Prague – 16 February 2004 Prague) was a Czech comedian and satirist. He was most famous for his double act with Jiří Grossmann on their show Návštěvní dny at the Semafor theatre, presented at the break of 1960s and 1970s.

Later he cooperated with Luděk Sobota, Petr Nárožný, Jiří Krampol, and finally Zuzana Bubílková.

He is the brother of Dutch television personality and tennis coach Martin Šimek (who trained e.g. Michiel Schapers).

External links
 České filmové nebe 

1940 births
2004 deaths
Czech male actors
Czech poets
Czech male poets
Male actors from Prague
20th-century Czech poets
20th-century male writers